
Gmina Sadowie is a rural gmina (administrative district) in Opatów County, Świętokrzyskie Voivodeship, in south-central Poland.

The gmina contains part of the protected area called Jeleniowska Landscape Park.

Villages
Gmina Sadowie contains the villages and settlements of Biskupice, Bogusławice, Bukowiany, Czerwona Góra, Grocholice, Jacentów, Łężyce, Małoszyce, Michałów, Niemienice, Obręczna, Okręglica, Porudzie, Ruszków, Ruszkowiec, Rżuchów, Sadowie, Szczucice, Truskolasy, Wszechświęte, Zochcin and Zwola.

Neighbouring gminas
Gmina Sadowie is bordered by the gminas of Baćkowice, Bodzechów, Ćmielów, Opatów and Waśniów.

References
Polish official population figures 2006

Sadowie
Opatów County